Meechie is a female African American dance music singer from Chicago. She placed two songs on the US Billboard Hot Dance Music/Club Play chart in the 1990s, "Bring Me Joy" and "You'll Never Find." "Bring Me Joy" spent one week at #74 in the UK Singles Chart in September 1995.

See also

List of number-one dance hits (United States)
List of artists who reached number one on the US Dance chart

References

American dance musicians
American house musicians
Singers from Chicago
Year of birth missing (living people)
Living people
20th-century African-American women singers